Sergio González or Gonzalez may refer to:

 Sergio González (sailor) (born 1925), Mexican sailor
 Sergio Gonzalez (wrestler) (born 1947), American former wrestler
 Sergio González Rodríguez (1950–2017), Mexican journalist
 Sergio González Morales (born 1952), better known as "Tilo", Chilean composer
 Sergio González García (born 1955), Mexican politician
 Sergio González (footballer, born 1961), Argentine footballer
 Sergio (footballer, born 1976), Spanish former footballer and manager of the Catalonia national team
 Sergio González (beach volleyball) (born 1990), Cuban beach volleyballer
 Sergio González (footballer, born 1992), Spanish footballer
 Sergio González (footballer, born 1995), Argentine footballer
 Sergio González (footballer, born 1997), Spanish footballer

See also:
 Sergio Boris (footballer) (born 1980), Spanish footballer born Sergio Boris González Monteagudo
 Sergi González (born 1995), Spanish footballer